The 2019–20 CBA season was the 25th season of the Chinese Basketball Association (CBA). The regular season began on 1 November 2019 with the Guangdong Southern Tigers hosting the Liaoning Flying Leopards.

The CBA regular season was suspended since 1 February 2020 due to the coronavirus pandemic. The season was resumed on 20 June 2020. The regular season was concluded on 27 July 2020. The playoffs started on 31 July 2020 and concluded on 15 August 2020.

Team changes

Name changes
The CBA changed the name of the following five teams as a part of an ongoing plan.
 Beikong Fly Dragons changed their name to Beijing Royal Fighters in May 2019.
 Guangzhou Long-Lions changed their name to Guangzhou Loong Lions in May 2019.
 Shandong Golden Stars changed their name to Shandong Heroes in May 2019.
 Shenzhen Leopards changed their name to Shenzhen Aviators in May 2019.
 Tianjin Gold Lions changed their name to Tianjin Pioneers in May 2019.

Venues
Listed below are the home arenas for the 2019–20 CBA season.

Note: Venues in italics denote the ones will be used from 20 June 2020 to the end of the season.

Head coaches
Listed below are the head coaches for the 2019–20 CBA season.

Draft
The 2019 CBA Draft, the fifth edition of the CBA draft, took place on 29 July 2019 in Shanghai. 16 players were selected in the draft.

Foreign players policy
All teams except the Bayi Rockets (a club owned by the People's Liberation Army) can have two foreign players. The bottom two teams from the previous season (except Bayi) have the additional right to sign an extra Asian player.

Rules chart
The rules for using foreign players in each game are described in this chart:

+ Including players from Hong Kong and Taiwan.

++ If a team waives its right to sign an extra Asian player, it may use its 2 foreign players for 7 quarters collectively.

+++ Only 1 allowed in the 4th quarter.

Import chart
This is the full list of international players competing in the CBA during the 2019–20 season. One major change is that many teams began to actively sign "reserve" imports this season to provide insurance for injuries. Players who sign contracts but are not actually playing will be listed under the heading of "Inactive Or Replaced" during the 2019–20 season. Those who never actually play in games before the end of the season will have their names removed from this list when the season ends.

Regular Season Standings

Playoffs
Because of the format change due to the COVID-19 pandemic, the Playoffs in this season will be shortened - the first two rounds will be played as one-off matches, and the last two rounds will be played in best-of-three games.

First round

(5) Zhejiang Lions vs. (12) Fujian Sturgeons

(6) Zhejiang Golden Bulls vs. (11) Shanxi Loongs

(7) Beijing Royal Fighters vs. (10) Jilin Northeast Tigers

(8) Qingdao Eagles vs. (9) Shandong Heroes

Quarter-finals

(1) Guangdong Southern Tigers vs. (8) Qingdao Eagles

(2) Xinjiang Flying Tigers vs. (7) Beijing Royal Fighters

(3) Liaoning Flying Leopards vs. (6) Zhejiang Golden Bulls

(4) Beijing Ducks vs. (12) Fujian Sturgeons

Semi-finals

(1) Guangdong Southern Tigers vs. (4) Beijing Ducks

(2) Xinjiang Flying Tigers vs. (3) Liaoning Flying Leopards

Finals

(1) Guangdong Southern Tigers vs. (3) Liaoning Flying Leopards

Statistics
Listed below are the 2019–20 CBA season's final individual and team statistical leaders. The CBA is like the NCAA, and unlike the NBA, in the practice of combining regular season statistics with playoff statistics.

Statistical leaders – individual

More info needed

Awards
Listed below are the 2019–20 CBA season's weekly, monthly, and annual awards.

Yearly awards
This is a list of the 2019–20 CBA season's yearly awards winners.

All-CBA First Team:
 F Hu Jinqiu, Zhejiang Lions
 F Zhai Xiaochuan, Beijing Ducks
 C Yi Jianlian, Guangdong Southern Tigers
 G Wu Qian, Zhejiang Golden Bulls
 G Sun Minghui, Zhejiang Lions

All-CBA Second Team:
 F Ren Junfei, Guangdong Southern Tigers
 F Jiang Yuxing, Jilin Northeast Tigers
 C Zhou Qi, Xinjiang Flying Tigers
 G Zhao Jiwei, Liaoning Flying Leopards
 G Zhao Rui, Guangdong Southern Tigers

Players of the Week
This is a list of the 2019–20 CBA season's Player of the Week award winners.

Players of the Month
This is a list of the 2019–20 CBA season's Player of the Month award winners.

Young Rising Stars of the Month
This is a list of the 2019–20 CBA season's Young Rising Star of the Month award winners.

All-Star Weekend
The 25th CBA All-Star Game and associated events were held in January 2020. Saturday features the Rising Stars Challenge, in which a team of CBA Rookies & Sophomores face a squad of students from the Chinese University Basketball Association, as well as the preliminaries of the Slam Dunk Contest, Three-Point Shootout, and Skills Competition. Sunday features the All-Star Game, with the South hosting the North, and the finals of the three individual events taking place at halftime.

Notes

References

External links
CBA Official Website
CBA China - 2019-20 Standings and Stats on Basketball-Reference.com

League
Chinese Basketball Association seasons
CBA
Chinese Basketball Association